
Palestina may refer to:

Hebrew
 Palestina (EY), English transliteration of the official Hebrew (פלשתינה (א״י, a name for Palestine in use during Mandatory Palestine (1920–1948), with EY meaning Eretz Yisrael (land of Israel)

Latin American places
 Palestina de Goiás, Brazil
 Palestina, Alagoas, Brazil
 Palestina, São Paulo, Brazil
 Palestina, Huila, Colombia
 Palestina, Caldas, Colombia
 Palestina, Ecuador
 Palestina Canton
 Palestina de Los Altos, Guatemala
 Palestina, Peru
 Palestina, United States Virgin Islands
 Nueva Palestina, inside the Ocosingo municipality, Mexico

Other uses
 Palestina, a female professional wrestler from the Gorgeous Ladies of Wrestling
 Palaestina (spider), a genus of ant spiders

See also
Palestine (disambiguation)
Palestyna (disambiguation)